Air Vice Marshal Ian Michael Stewart,  is a former senior commander in the Royal Air Force who served as Air Secretary from 1998 until his retirement in 2003.

RAF career
Stewart joined the Royal Air Force (RAF) as a pilot in 1969. He flew Harriers, commanded No. 1 (Fighter) Squadron and went on to be Station Commander at RAF Gutersloh and to command the Harrier Field Force in Germany. He became Air Secretary in 1998 before retiring in 2003. He was a member of the Armed Forces Pay Review Body from 2005 to 2011. In retirement he worked for the Defence Vetting Agency in the Gloucestershire / Herefordshire area and was Chairman of Marsden Weighing Machine Group from 2007 to November 2019. From 2017 to June 2020 he served as the Personnel Director on the Gloucestershire Warwickshire Railway.

References

Living people
Royal Air Force air marshals
Companions of the Order of the Bath
Recipients of the Air Force Cross (United Kingdom)
Year of birth missing (living people)